Bearwood and Merley is a ward in Poole, Dorset. Since 2019, the ward has elected 3 councillors to Bournemouth, Christchurch and Poole Council.

Demographics

Geography 
The ward contains the suburbs of Bearwood and Merley. It primarily covers the area of the similarly named former Poole Borough Council ward of Merley and Bearwood. The ward is divided between the Parliamentary Constituencies of Bournemouth West and Mid Dorset and North Poole.

Councillors 
The ward is currently represented by three Liberal Democrat councillors.

Election results

2019

2015

2011

2007

2003

References 

Wards of Bournemouth, Christchurch and Poole
Politics of Poole